Ongetkatel is a channel of water and island of Palau, administrated by the State of Koror.

References

Uninhabited islands of Palau